K-5 (pronounced "kay through five") is an American  term for the education period from kindergarten to fifth grade.  It receives equal amounts of criticism and support in the educational industry.  While many early childhood experts deem it too closely aligned with more developmentally inappropriate "watered-down" early elementary teaching methods, administrators and policy-makers see it as a way to integrate kindergarten under the guise of the No Child Left Behind Act of 2001.

See also 
 Elementary school (United States)
 Primary school
 Educational stage

References

Educational stages
Educational years
School terminology
Early childhood education in the United States